Tylomelania is a genus of freshwater snails which have an operculum, aquatic gastropod mollusks in the family Pachychilidae. In the aquarium hobby, snails from this genus are commonly known as "rabbit snails" (not to be confused with sea hares).

A sister group (the closest relative) of Tylomelania is genus Pseudopotamis (2 species living on the Torres Strait Islands). Tylomelania and Pseudopotamis split in the Middle Miocene c. 19.5 Mya.

Distribution 

These freshwater snails are endemic to Sulawesi in Indonesia, with the vast majority restricted to Lake Poso and the Malili Lake system (consisting of Matano and Towuti, and the smaller Lontoa (Wawantoa), Mahalona, Masapi).

They probably cannot live at an altitude above about 700 m.

Species 
There were known 34 described species in 2005. Thomas von Rintelen with colleagues described 15 new species of Tylomelania in 2003–2008.

Tylomelania species diversification started in c. 5.4 Mya and was probably caused by the late Miocene and Pliocene orogeny.

Species within the genus Tylomelania include:
 Tylomelania abendanoni (Kruimel, 1913)
 Tylomelania amphiderita von Rintelen, Bouchet & Glaubrecht, 2007
 Tylomelania bakara von Rintelen & Glaubrecht, 2003
 Tylomelania baskasti von Rintelen & Glaubrecht, 2008
 Tylomelania carbo Sarasin & Sarasin, 1897
 Tylomelania carota (Sarasin & Sarasin, 1898)
 Tylomelania celebicola (Sarasin & Sarasin, 1898)
 Tylomelania centaurus (Sarasin & Sarasin, 1898)
 Tylomelania confusa von Rintelen, Bouchet & Glaubrecht, 2007
 Tylomelania connectens Sarasin & Sarasin, 1898
 Tylomelania gemmifera (Sarasin & Sarasin, 1897)
 Tylomelania hannelorae von Rintelen & Glaubrecht, 2008
 Tylomelania helmuti von Rintelen & Glaubrecht, 2003
 Tylomelania inconspicua von Rintelen, Bouchet & Glaubrecht, 2007
 Tylomelania insulaesacrae (Sarasin & Sarasin, 1897)
 Tylomelania kristinae von Rintelen, Bouchet & Glaubrecht, 2007
 Tylomelania kruimeli von Rintelen & Glaubrecht, 2003
 Tylomelania kuli (Sarasin & Sarasin, 1898)
 Tylomelania lalemae (Kruimel, 1913)
 Tylomelania mahalonensis (Kruimel, 1913) – synonym: Tylomelania mahalonica (Kruimel, 1913)

 Tylomelania marwotoae von Rintelen, Bouchet & Glaubrecht, 2007
 Tylomelania masapensis (Kruimel, 1913)
 Tylomelania matannensis von Rintelen, Bouchet & Glaubrecht, 2007
 Tylomelania molesta (Sarasin & Sarasin, 1897)
 Tylomelania monacha (Sarasin & Sarasin, 1899)
 Tylomelania neritiformis Sarasin & Sarasin, 1897 – type species
 Tylomelania palicolarum (Sarasin & Sarasin, 1897)
 Tylomelania patriarchalis (Sarasin & Sarasin, 1897)
 Tylomelania perconica (Sarasin & Sarasin, 1898)
 Tylomelania perfecta (Mousson, 1849)
 Tylomelania porcellanica Sarasin & Sarasin, 1897
 Tylomelania robusta (Martens, 1897)
 Tylomelania sarasinorum (Kruimel, 1913)
 Tylomelania scalariopsis (Sarasin & Sarasin, 1897)
 Tylomelania sinabartfeldi von Rintelen & Glaubrecht, 2008
 Tylomelania solitaria 
 Tylomelania tominangensis (Kruimel, 1913)
 Tylomelania tomoriensis (Sarasin & Sarasin, 1898)
 Tylomelania toradjarum (Sarasin & Sarasin, 1897)
 Tylomelania towutensis (Sarasin & Sarasin, 1897)
 Tylomelania towutica (Kruimel, 1913)
 Tylomelania turriformis von Rintelen, Bouchet & Glaubrecht, 2007
 Tylomelania wallacei (Reeve, 1860)
 Tylomelania wesseli von Rintelen, Bouchet & Glaubrecht, 2007
 Tylomelania wolterecki von Rintelen, Bouchet & Glaubrecht, 2007
 Tylomelania zeamais (Sarasin & Sarasin, 1897)

Description 
In species within this genus, the albumen gland is very large. Pallial oviduct evolved into an uterine brood (that release shelled juvenile snails).

Comparison of apertural views of shells of twenty Tylomelania species (images are not to scale):

Ecology 
Species in the genus Tylomelania are ovoviviparous. Newly hatched snails of some species of Tylomelania measure nearly 2 cm and are the largest newly hatched viviparous gastropods.

References

External links 

 von Rintelen T., Wilson A. B., Meyer A. & Glaubrecht M. (2004). "Escalation and trophic specialization drive adaptive radiation of freshwater gastropods in ancient lakes on Sulawesi, Indonesia". Proceedings of the Royal Society B 271: 2541–2549. .

Tylomelania
Gastropod genera